Ronald Brittain  (2 September 1899 – 9 January 1981) was a regimental sergeant major (RSM) in the British Army. Reported on widely in the newspapers of the day, he featured in several British military training films during the Second World War. He was said to have possibly the loudest voice in the British Army.

On retiring from the army in the 1950s, Brittain's fame enabled him to enjoy a career in advertising, voice-over work and acting, playing characters that resembled an archetypal Sergeant Major.

Early life
Brittain was born in Gordon Terrace, Aigburth Vale, Liverpool, the son of a gardener. After leaving school, he worked in a local butcher's shop until 1917, when he enlisted in the King's (Liverpool) Regiment during the First World War.

Military service
Brittany transferred into the South Wales Borderers, where his imposing height of six feet three inches soon saw him promoted. Eventually Brittain transferred to the Coldstream Guards.

He was attached to the training staff at the Royal Military College, Sandhurst, where he became well known for his parade ground bellow.
Known to the cadets as "The Voice", he was credited as the originator of that phrase so beloved of sergeant majors: "You 'orrible little man!". It was said he could reduce gentleman cadets — many of them foreign princes and titled sons of the aristocracy — to trembling wrecks.

In his later years, he was assigned the position of Regimental Sergeant Major of the Guards Depot. He also served at Mons Officer Cadet School in Aldershot, where it was estimated that around 40,000 officer cadets passed through his parade ground.

Retirement
In 1954 Brittain retired from the army after 37 years' service (20 years as an RSM); he was well above the normal retirement age for service personnel. After a spell as a salesman for an outsized clothing outfitters, he acted in films and plays. He also lent his legendary voice to a number of radio and television advertisements. In 1959 his voice was featured on a record, "Regimental Rock" released on the Saga label.
Still an imposing figure in old age, Brittain was a popular presence at public functions and a member of the Society of Toastmasters.

Death
Brittany died at Chester in 1981, aged 81.

Award and decorations

Complete as at 1953.

Filmography

Discography
The Saga Satellites with RSM Brittain - Regimental Rock (Saga Records, 1959)

Notes
Citations

Bibliography

External links

The Army's Voice No 1 , a news report from British Pathé in 1953
Picture of R.S.M. Brittain in action
Poster of R.S.M. Brittain from shinycapstar.com - Coldstream guards website

1899 births
1981 deaths
Members of the Order of the British Empire
People from Aigburth
Academics of the Royal Military College, Sandhurst
English male film actors
English male voice actors
Male actors from Liverpool
20th-century English male actors
Recipients of the Meritorious Service Medal (United Kingdom)
Military personnel from Liverpool
British Army personnel of World War I
Coldstream Guards soldiers
South Wales Borderers soldiers
King's Regiment (Liverpool) soldiers
British Army personnel of World War II